The Women's 400 metres event  at the 2011 European Athletics Indoor Championships was held at March 4 & 5 with the final being held on March 5 at 17:30 local time.

Records

Results

Heats
First 3 in each heat and 3 best performers advanced to the Semifinals.

The heats were held at 10:20.

Semifinal 
First 3 in each heat advanced to the Final.

The semifinals were held at 17:55.

Final 
The final was held at 17:30.

References 

400 metres at the European Athletics Indoor Championships
2011 European Athletics Indoor Championships
2011 in women's athletics